"Burn the House Down" is a song by American indie pop band AJR. It was released on March 23, 2018 from the deluxe edition of their second studio album The Click.

Background
AJR created the song for two reasons: to reflect the current position of American politics and to help create the theme song for Morgan Spurlock's newest documentary, Super Size Me 2: Holy Chicken!.

Morgan Spurlock reached out to the band on Twitter, AJR wrote an uptempo track after watching Supersize Me 2: Holy Chicken, and said: "We wanted to create a song that captured that passion. If enough underdogs band together, real change can happen, and we wanted to help inspire that change in 'Burn the House Down.

Charts

Weekly charts

Year-end charts

Certifications

References

AJR (band) songs
2018 singles
2018 songs